Me la debes (rough English translation: You owe me one) is a 2001 Mexican short film produced by Producciones Anhelo and directed by Carlos Cuarón.  The film is a sex farce, satirizing the religious beliefs and sexuality of a Mexican middle-class family.

Cast
 Fernando Becerril as Papá 
 Paloma Woolrich as Mamá 
 Flor Eduarda Gurrola as Marce 
 Marco Pérez as Chivito 
 Catalina López as Chela

External links

2001 comedy films
Mexican short films
2000s Spanish-language films
2001 films
2001 short films
Comedy short films
2000s Mexican films